RV Sikuliaq is an American research vessel owned by the National Science Foundation and operated by the University of Alaska Fairbanks College of Fisheries and Ocean Sciences. Built in 2014 by Marinette Marine Corporation in Marinette, Wisconsin, the $200 million vessel replaced the 1966-built research vessel Alpha Helix that was retired in 2007. Sikuliaq, named after the Iñupiaq word for "young sea ice" and pronounced "see-KOO-lee-auk", will be homeported in Seward, Alaska.

Construction
The original science mission requirement of the new research vessel was prepared by a committee of the UNOLS Fleet Improvement Committee in 1998. In 2001, Congress appropriated $1 million for a design study of a suitable vessel. The vessel, called Alaska Region Research Vessel (ARRV), was designed by The Glosten Associates, a Seattle-based group of naval architects, in 2004.

In May 2009, the National Science Foundation announced that it had received funding for the construction of an ice-capable research vessel designed to support scientific research in high-latitude waters. In December 2009, the $123 million contract for the construction of the $200 million vessel was awarded to Marinette Marine Corporation of Marinette, Wisconsin, and the ceremonial signing of the contract was held on 5 February 2010. In January 2010, the University of Alaska Fairbanks chose an Alaska Native name Sikuliaq, meaning "young sea ice" in the Iñupiaq language, after receiving more than 150 suggestions. 

The keel of the vessel was laid down on 11 April 2011 and she was launched on 13 October 2012. Although Sikuliaq was initially expected to arrive in her homeport of Seward, Alaska, in January 2014, her delivery was delayed due to technical problems and she spent her first winter in the Great Lakes. Sikuliaq was finally handed over to the National Science Foundation on 6 June 2014. During the summer of 2014, she passed through the Panama Canal and began science operations in the equatorial Pacific and along the US west coast in the autumn. She then headed to Alaska, where the vessel arrived in February 2015, making a port visit in Ketchikan. She was officially commissioned in March 2015 at her home port of Seward.

Description

Mission and capabilities
Sikuliaq allows up to 26 scientists and students to conduct multi-disciplinary studies in high latitude open seas, near-shore regions and single-year sea ice, and facilitates the real-time virtual participation of classroom students via broadband connections. The major research opportunities include the effect of climate change and increased human use of Arctic regions on various issues such as ocean circulation and ecosystem dynamics.

One of the most advanced research vessels ever built, Sikuliaq has extensive scientific facilities. In addition, Sikuliaq is fitted with flexible over-side handling equipment such as an A-frame in the stern as well as a number of science winches and cranes on the aft deck. She also has a retractable transducer centerboard (drop keel) for deploying various sensors under the vessel.

Technical details 

Designed for operations in ice-infested waters, the vessel has a sloping icebreaker bow and a hull that is two feet wider at the bow than in the stern to reduce ice resistance. She is served by a crew of 20 and has provisions for two additional marine technicians.

Sikuliaq has a diesel-electric powertrain in which the main diesel generators produce power for electric motors coupled to the propellers. She is powered by two  16-cylinder and two  12-cylinder MTU 4000 series high speed diesel engines. Sikuliaq is one of the first vessels ever to be fitted with Icepod propulsion units, Wärtsilä's brand of ice-strengthened azimuth thrusters that can be rotated 360 degrees about the vertical axis. The Z-drive thrusters are "pulling", meaning that the propellers are facing to the direction the vessel is moving to improve the hydrodynamic efficiency. In addition, they are "can-mounted", meaning that the thrusters can be disconnected and lifted off for maintenance without docking the vessel. She is also fitted with a bow thruster to assist maneuvering at low speeds.

She also has dynamic positioning capability.

References

External links
 

2012 ships
Research vessels of the National Science Foundation
Science and technology in Alaska
Seward, Alaska
University of Alaska Fairbanks
University-National Oceanographic Laboratory System research vessels
Ships built by Marinette Marine